In Ireland, a driving licence is an official document which authorises its holder to operate various types of motor vehicle on roads to which the public have access. Since 29 October 2013, they are issued by the National Driver Licence Service (NDLS). Based on the European driving licence standards, all the categories of licence available and the physical licence meet the 2006 EU standards.

History 
From 19 January 2013 new licences issued are similar in size and shape to a credit-card (85.6 × 53.98 mm) as stipulated in Directive 2006/126/EEC. 
It features the driver's name and date of birth, their photo, signature and any restrictions or endorsements such as the need to wear glasses and any penalty points accrued. The older type licence (106 x 222 mm) is still valid but will be replaced by the new type upon licence renewal.

From January 2014 the NDLS started to issue an electronic driving licence containing all the information relating to the licence. This provides additional security and protection against fraud. The microchip enables the licence to be read by special card readers which are managed by the Road Safety Authority and are available to the Garda Síochána,however, not all of the categories on the new licence are obtainable. An oversight in production of the licence means that category B1 appears on the driving licence in Ireland but cannot be obtained.

The old licence was based on the old European format, defined in Directive 91/439/EEC, as was used in other countries in the past. It consisted of a pink tri-fold paper document, laminated on one side. It contained a photo of the driver, their personal details and home address, and a listing of categories of vehicle they are licensed for, with any restrictions printed using a code format. The un-laminated side consisted of a section for any written-in endorsements as well as a page with the term 'Driving licence' or its equivalents in a large number of languages.

Both learner permits and the former provisional licences are identical in format to full licences, but green in colour. They do not carry the full translations list as they are not valid outside of the Republic of Ireland and are marked as such on the front. Once a driving test has been passed, all categories of driver with the exception of motorcycle drivers have no restrictions on road usage or vehicle type.

Prior to serious reforms in 2007, many people who drove never completed the process of receiving a full licence - 400,000 people held provisional licences in October 2007 when the new Learner Permit system was introduced. Serious crackdowns and a huge increase in testing facilities have brought this number down heavily.

The reason for the high number of people driving under a Provisional Licence under the old system was because a Provisional Licence holder could drive unaccompanied after obtaining their second Provisional Licence, and many drivers chose this route rather than going through the full testing process. This system was very unusual - most countries' provisional/learner licences require a fully qualified driver to accompany a learner.

Driver theory test
The driver theory test is carried out by Prometric Ireland on behalf of the RSA.

Candidates get asked forty multiple choice questions. In order to pass the theory test, candidates must score at least 35/40. Anything scored under 35 is a fail and the test must be retaken.

Learner Permit

(Provisional Licence)
Obtaining a Learner Permit requires passing the afore-mentioned computerised theory test. Also required for the Learner Permit are: valid proof of address, valid proof of PPSN, valid photographic ID and Eyesight Report (where necessary). The Application Form for a Learner Permit D201 must be filled in and brought to the local NDLS office.

Those on Learner Permits for most categories of licence must not drive unaccompanied. No Learner Permit holders are allowed to drive on motorways and all must display red L-plates at all times, either on their vehicle or on a tabard if a motorcyclist.

Driving licence categories
This is a list of the categories that can be found on a driving licence in the Republic of Ireland.

Note: The category B1 appears on the driving licence in Ireland but cannot be obtained as it doesn't actually exist there.

¹ MAM (Maximum Authorised Mass)

Penalty points

Since 2002, Ireland, like other EU states, has operated a penalty points system for driving offences. If a driver accrues 12 points, their licence is revoked for (at least) 6 months.

Gallery

See also
 European driving licence
 For Northern Ireland see Driving licence in the United Kingdom
 Irish passport
 Prawo Jazdy (alleged criminal)

External links
 National Driver Licence Service (responsible for issuing and renewal of Driving Licences since 26/10/2013)
 Road Safety Authority (responsible for Driving Licences until 26/10/2013)

References

Transport in the Republic of Ireland
Ireland